Nathan Gabriel de Souza Mendes (born 19 August 2002), known simply as Nathan, is a Brazilian professional footballer who plays as a right back for São Paulo FC

References

External links

2002 births
Living people
Association football defenders
Brazilian footballers
São Paulo FC players
Coritiba Foot Ball Club players